Cyaniris bellis, the Greek mazarine blue, is a butterfly found in the Palearctic (Asia Minor, South Europe, North Africa, Transcaucasia, Iran) that belongs to the blues family.

Taxonomy
The subspecies C. b. antiochena (Lederer, 1861) is found in Caucasus Minor, Armenia (highlands) and the Talysh Mountains.

Description from Seitz

bellis Frr. (82 e, f) is above like montana . [preceding text — montana M.-Dur (82 e) is an alpine form [of semiargus] which occurs in the higher Alps and the mountains of South-East Europe; smaller, the male bright blue above, with broader black distal border]  but the hindwing beneath bears traces of yellowish red spots in anal area.  In helena Stgr. (82 f), a small form from the mountains of Southern Greece, the reddish yellow spots of the underside form a continuous chain and some of them appear in the female also on the upperside, which is quite generally the case in the still more southern form antiochena Led.

Biology
The larva feeds on Anthyllis vulneraria , Trifolium pratense, Melilotus officinalis, Lotus corniculatus.

See also
List of butterflies of Russia

References

Polyommatini